The 1921–22 WCHL season was the first season for the  Western Canada Hockey League. Four teams played 24 games each. The Regina Capitals defeated the regular-season champion Edmonton Eskimos in a two-game total-goals series to win the inaugural league championship.

Regular season

Final standings
Note: W = Wins, L = Losses, T = Ties, GF = Goals for, GA = Goals against, Pts = points

1 The Saskatoon Crescents relocated to Moose Jaw as the Moose Jaw Crescents on 3 February 1922.

Playoffs

Edmonton and Regina ended the season with identical records of 14–9–1 with the sole tie being between the two teams. To decide first place, it was agreed to replay the tie game. Edmonton won the rematch 11–2 to place first.

The Capitals defeated the Calgary Tigers 2–1 (1–0, 1–1) in a two-game totals-goals series to determine second place. The Capitals then went on to beat first place Edmonton 3–2 (1–1, 2–1) in the league's first championship series.

Regina then advanced to play the Pacific Coast Hockey Association champion Vancouver Millionaires in the Stanley Cup playoffs for the right to play in the Stanley Cup final. The Capitals won the first game but lost the two-game total goals series 2–5 (2–1, 0–4). Vancouver advanced to the Stanley Cup final against the Toronto St. Patricks of the National Hockey League, with Toronto winning the Stanley Cup, three games to two.

Scoring leaders

See also
List of Stanley Cup champions
1921–22 NHL season
1921–22 PCHA season
1921 in sports
1922 in sports

References

Bibliography

 

Western Canada Hockey League seasons
WCHL